Stand Back is the first proper album by The Arrows released in 1984, that featured three hit Canadian singles.  Producer David Tyson was nominated for a Juno Award in 1984 for "Producer of the Year", for his work on this album.

Track listing 
"Meet Me in the Middle" (Dean McTaggart, David Tyson) - 4:09
"Say It Isn't True" (McTaggart, Tyson) - 4:10
"Fallen Angel" - (McTaggart) - 5:40
"Never Be Another One" (McTaggart, Tyson, Doug Macaskill) - 4:07
"Girl in 313" (McTaggart, Tyson) - 4:38
"Stand Back" (McTaggart, Tyson) - 4:26
"Enough is Never Enough" (McTaggart, Tyson) - 4:10
"I Owe You" (McTaggart, Tyson) - 5:24
"Easy Street" (McTaggart, Tyson) - 5:09

Singles
The following Canadian singles were released from the album:
 "Meet Me in the Middle" (#30, July 1984)
 "Say It Isn't True" 
 "Never Be Another One"
 "Easy Street"

Album credits

Personnel
Dean McTaggart - vocals, background vocals
Doug Macaskill - guitars
Rob Gusevs - keyboards
Earl Seymour - tenor saxophone, bass clarinet
Peter Bleakney - bass
Howard Aye - bass
Michael Sloski - drums
Gary Craig - drums
Matt Zimbel - percussion
Eddie Schwartz - background vocals
Al Van Wart - background vocals
David Tyson - keyboards, background vocals

Production
David Tyson - producer, arrangement
The Arrows - arrangement
Kevin Doyle - Recording Engineer
Vic Pyle - Assistant Engineer
Scott Litt - mixing engineer
David Moore - executive producer
Howie Weinberg - mastering at Masterdisc, New York
Dean Motter - art direction and graphics
Patrick Harbron - photography

External links
 Dean Motter - album cover design

1984 albums